Stenalia longipennis is a beetle in the genus Stenalia of the family Mordellidae. It was described in 1952 by Ermisch.

References

longipennis
Beetles described in 1952